Martin Ramsay McKenzie (born 14 August 1992) is a Rugby union footballer who plays as either a Fly-half or Fullback. He represents the Southland Stags in the Mitre 10 Cup. He currently plays for the Chiefs in super rugby.

McKenzie was a member of the New Zealand under 20 side that competed in the 2012 IRB Junior World Championship in South Africa.

McKenzie is the cousin of former Stags teammate Robbie Robinson and also brother of Chiefs First-five Damian McKenzie

In March 2014 Mckenzie was called up to play for the New Zealand Sevens team.

Notes

External links
 itsrugby.co.uk profile

1992 births
Living people
Blues (Super Rugby) players
Chiefs (rugby union) players
Crusaders (rugby union) players
Māori All Blacks players
New Zealand rugby union players
Ospreys (rugby union) players
People educated at Christ's College, Christchurch
People educated at Gore High School
Rugby union fullbacks
Rugby union players from Invercargill
Southland rugby union players
Taranaki rugby union players